Nicolas Ladvocat-Billiard (died 12 April 1681, Boulogne-Sur-Mer) was a French cleric and doctor of theology. He became grand vicar and canon of Paris before being made bishop of Boulogne in 1677, in succession to François Perrochel. He died in office and was succeeded by Claude Le Tonnelier de Breteuil.

References

Sources
Eugène Van Drival, Histoire des évêques de Boulogne, Boulogne-sur-Mer, 1852

Bishops of Boulogne
1681 deaths